Glen Schofield is an American video game artist, designer, director, and producer, he is currently the CEO of the Striking Distance Studios. He was formerly the vice president and general manager at Visceral Games, co-founder of Sledgehammer Games, and the creator and executive producer of the third-person survival horror video game Dead Space.

Career
Schofield trained in both fine arts and business, earning a BFA from Pratt Institute and an MBA from Golden Gate University. His career began as an artist and art director with the New Jersey video game company Absolute Entertainment. He then relocated to Seattle to join the West Coast's burgeoning video games industry. His professional influences included Asteroids, Moon Patrol, Gunstar Heroes, Disruptor and the Contra series, followed later by Resident Evil, Gears of War, and the franchise he would eventually contribute to, Modern Warfare.

As a vice president at Crystal Dynamics, Schofield headed development on two of the studio's franchises: Gex and Legacy of Kain. Moving to EA Redwood Studios (later Visceral Games) as general manager, he collaborated with Bret Robbins, including the popular Lord of the Rings video series and 007: From Russia with Love.

Schofield's reputation grew with the 2008 title Dead Space, which the magazine Edge called "a work of passionate sci-fi horror that became one of most commercially successful new properties of the year." Schofield has said that the film Event Horizon inspired him to create a game that fused the genres of science fiction and horror. The game's theme of humans in space losing perspective to their place in the universe is influenced by the works of Arthur C. Clarke, after whom the game character Isaac Clarke was named.

Schofield, executive producer on the project, worked with Michael Condrey, senior development director. The game launched a franchise of sequels, comics, novels and films, and went on to win more than 80 industry awards, including the Academy of Interactive Arts & Sciences' Action Game of the Year and two awards from the British Academy of Film and Television Arts. During his time at EA Redwood Studios, the studio was ranked 17th in the top 50 Game Developers List of 2009 by Game Developer Research. Edge named him one of the Hot 100 Game Developers of 2009.

In 2009, Schofield and Condrey created Sledgehammer Games, with Schofield as general manager and Condrey as chief operating officer. They retained those roles when, that November, Activision acquired the company as a wholly owned development studio operating on an independent model.

Schofield was also a storyboard director and created over 100 characters for the animated series The Adventures of the Galaxy Rangers.

In June 2019, Schofield announced that he was joining Krafton as the CEO of a new development team called Striking Distance Studios. Under Schofield, the studio will be developing a game with a narrative experience set in the PlayerUnknown's Battlegrounds universe. The game would later drop this connection in May of 2022, no longer being attached to the PlayerUnknown's Battlegrounds universe. The Callisto Protocol was revealed at The Game Awards 2020 and planned for release in 2022.

Personal life
He is married and has three children, paints in his spare time, and is a habitual exerciser, both cardiovascular and weight training, averaging once a day while on deadline, twice that when not.

Games

References

External links
Personal website
Sledgehammer Games official site
 
 
MobyGames profile
 

Year of birth missing (living people)
American video game designers
American video game directors
American video game producers
Golden Gate University alumni
Living people
People from New Jersey
Video game artists